Rain is an Indonesian soap opera musical comedy drama produced by Amanah Surga Productions that airs daily on SCTV. The cast includes Cassandra Sheryl Lee, Randy Martin, Stefhanie Zamora Husen, Salshabilla Adriani, Endy Arfian with cameo appearances from actors from Indonesian films and television.

Cast
 Cassandra Lee as Rain
 Randy Martin as Fahri
 Salshabilla Adriani as Viona
 Steffi Zamora as Angel
 Endy Arfian as Rangga
 Aldy Rialdy as Syahroni
 Arbani Yasiz as Kelvin
 Amel Carla as Syahreni
 Verlita Evelyn as Luna
 Shandy Syarif as Billy
 Kinaryosih as Indah
 Ari Wibowo as Rafa
 Marsya Aurelia as Venus
 Harlan Chaniago as Komar
 Virgoun Tambunan as Virgoun
 Pretty Asmara as Ani

References

External links
 
  Synopsis Rain at Website SCTV

2015 Indonesian television series debuts
Indonesian drama television series
Indonesian television soap operas
Indonesian comedy television series
Musical television soap operas
2010s Indonesian television series
2010s television soap operas